BioSystems is a monthly peer-reviewed scientific journal covering experimental, computational, and theoretical research that links biology, evolution, and the information processing sciences. It was established in 1967 as Currents in Modern Biology by Robert G. Grenell. In 1972 the journal was renamed Currents in Modern Biology: Bio Systems, which was shortened to BioSystems in 1974. Previous editors include J.P. Schadé, Alan W. Schwartz, Sidney W. Fox, Michael Conrad, Lynn Margulis, David B. Fogel, Gary B. Fogel, George Kampis, Francisco Lara-Ochoa, Koichiro Matsuno, Ray Paton, and W. Mike L. Holcombe.

According to the Journal Citation Reports, the journal has a 2020 impact factor of 1.973.

Abstracting and indexing
The journal is abstracted and indexed in:

References

External links
 

Elsevier academic journals
English-language journals
Publications established in 1967
Monthly journals
Evolutionary biology journals
Systems journals